J. Batty Langley (20 March 1834 – 19 February 1914) was a British Liberal Party politician.

He was born in Uppingham, Rutland, the son of Thomas Langley. He moved to Sheffield in the 1850s, and in 1863 commenced business on his own account as a timber merchant and became proprietor of the Sheaf Saw Mills. He was one of the city's most prominent non-conformists, attending Queen Street Congregational Church.  He was elected to Sheffield Town Council in 1871, serving many years and becoming an alderman in 1890.

In 1892, Langley became Mayor of Sheffield, and saw an eventful year in office. Sheffield became a city, while Langley organised a conference in the city, aiming to settle the 1893 coal strike.

Claiming to represent the interests of the working class, he was elected as the Member of Parliament at the 1894 Sheffield Attercliffe by-election.  As an employer, he was a controversial choice, and the Independent Labour Party stood a candidate against him. He was re-elected for Sheffield Attercliffe unopposed at the 1895 and 1900 general elections but in 1906, the Conservative Arnold Muir Wilson stood. Langley retained his Parliamentary seat until he retired in 1909, due to long-term ill health.

Langley became the first president of the National Association of General Railway Clerks (now Transport Salaried Staffs' Association) in 1897, although he resigned due to ill health the following year.

References

External links 
 

1834 births
1914 deaths
Burials at Sheffield General Cemetery
Liberal Party (UK) MPs for English constituencies
Lord Mayors of Sheffield
People from Uppingham
Presidents of the Transport Salaried Staffs' Association
UK MPs 1892–1895
UK MPs 1895–1900
UK MPs 1900–1906
UK MPs 1906–1910